Euphamiarunyi Ekunah, better known as GoodGirl LA, is a Nigerian singer and songwriter. In 2022, she was nominated with Vector for The Headies awards for best collaboration and best rap single for "Early Momo".

Early life and education 
Ekunah was born in Ajegunle. She attended the University of Calabar, but left to pursue her musical career. She previously performed as "Laden", which was shortened to "LA", and eventually became "GoodGirl LA".

Career 
GoodGirl LA's first singles included "Faraway", "Bless Me", and "Pina". In 2019, she released her debut EP LA Confidential. In 2020, she released her hit single "D4DM (Die For The Matter)".

Released on Valentine's Day 2021, "Early Momo" featuring GoodGirl LA is the lead single on Vector's album T.E.S.L.I.M. GoodGirl LA's song "Bando" was inspired by Nigerian youth participating in the #EndSARS protests.

Critical reception 
In 2021, This Day newspaper in Nigeria called "Bando" "a breath of fresh air".

Discography

EP
LA Confidential

Singles
"D4DM"

Awards and nominations

References 

Nigerian musicians
Year of birth missing (living people)
Living people